Nestoras is a former municipality in Messenia, Peloponnese, Greece. Since the 2011 local government reform it is part of the municipality Pylos-Nestor, of which it is a municipal unit. The municipal unit has an area of 91.902 km2. Population 5,042 (2011). The seat of the municipality was in Chora.

References

Populated places in Messenia